Semagystia cuhensis is a moth in the family Cossidae. It was described by Josef J. de Freina in 1994. It is found in Turkey and Transcaucasia.

References

Cossinae
Moths described in 1994